Olesya Ivanovna Barel (born 9 February 1960 in Kostroma) is a Russian former basketball player who competed in the 1988 Summer Olympics.

References

1960 births
Living people
Russian women's basketball players
Olympic basketball players of the Soviet Union
Basketball players at the 1988 Summer Olympics
Olympic bronze medalists for the Soviet Union
Olympic medalists in basketball
Soviet women's basketball players
Medalists at the 1988 Summer Olympics